Hubertus "Huub" Cornelis Marinus Baargarst (pseudonym Huub Huizenaar, 12 January 1909 – 25 October 1985) was a Dutch boxer who competed in the 1924 Summer Olympics. He was born in Rotterdam and died in Eindhoven. In 1924 he was eliminated in the first round of the lightweight class after losing his fight to Charles Sinclair.

References

External links
 

1909 births
1985 deaths
Lightweight boxers
Olympic boxers of the Netherlands
Boxers at the 1924 Summer Olympics
Boxers from Rotterdam
Dutch male boxers